AmeriCU Credit Union (AmeriCU) is a New York State Chartered credit union headquartered in Rome, New York, originally founded in 1950 as Griffiss Employees Credit Union. As of 2020, AmeriCU had more than 140,000 members and $2 billion in assets, and was the 13th largest credit union in New York.

Eligibility is open to those who live, work, worship or attend school in Central or Northern New York State as well as member and family members of active-duty, reserves, or veterans of the U.S. Military.

AmeriCU was named one of the Best Companies to Work for in New York State in 2018 and 2020, and in 2019, was chosen by Forbes as one of the best Credit Unions in New York State. The Credit Union National Association (CUNA) recognized AmeriCU in its Ongoing Event category for the Salute to the Troops Tribute Concert and the Marketing Association of Credit Unions (MAC) awarded AmeriCU two bronze awards for Website Design and Community Engagement in 2020.

AmeriCU is a not-for-profit financial institution owned and governed by its members. Ron Belle is the current President and CEO of AmeriCU Credit Union. Each year, the membership of the credit union votes for members who will serve as Directors on its seven-member, all-volunteer Board of Directors. Among other duties, the Board of Directors directs the affairs of AmeriCU according to all laws, regulations, requirements and sound business practices.

References 

Credit unions based in New York (state)
Organizations established in 1951
1951 establishments in New York (state)